The 2003 ABC Championship qualification was held in late 2002 and early 2003 with the Gulf region, West Asia, Southeast Asia, East Asia and Middle Asia (Central Asia and South Asia) each conducting tournaments.

Qualification format
The following are eligible to participate:

 The organizing country.
 The five best-placed teams from the previous ABC Championship.
 The two best teams from the sub-zones.

2001 ABC Championship

Qualified teams

East Asia
All the others withdrew, so  and  qualified automatically.

Gulf
The 2002 Gulf Basketball Association Championship is the qualifying tournament for the 2003 ABC Championship. the two best teams excluding Qatar qualifies for 2003 ABC Championship. The tournament was held at Dubai, United Arab Emirates.

Preliminary round

Final

Final standing

Middle Asia
The 2003 Middle Asia Basketball Championship  is the qualifying tournament for the 2003 ABC Championship. the two best teams qualifies for 2003 ABC Championship. The tournament was held at New Delhi, India.

Southeast Asia

The 5th Southeast Asia Basketball Association Championship is the qualifying tournament for the 2003 ABC Championship. the two best teams qualifies for 2003 ABC Championship. The tournament was held at Kuala Lumpur, Malaysia.

Round Robin

West Asia
The 2002/2003 West Asia Basketball Association Championship  is the qualifying tournament for the 2003 ABC Championship. the two best teams qualifies for 2003 ABC Championship. The tournament supposed to be held in 3 stages in Jordan, Iran and Iraq in late 2002 and early 2003 but the last round was cancelled.

External links
FIBA Asia official website 

2003
qualification
SEABA Championship
West Asian Basketball Championship